, formerly , is the police tactical unit of the German Federal Police (Bundespolizei). The state police (Landespolizei) maintain their own tactical units known as the Spezialeinsatzkommando (SEK). The identities of GSG 9 members are classified.

Origins
On 5 September 1972, the Palestinian terrorist movement Black September infiltrated the Summer Olympic Games in Munich, West Germany, to kidnap 11 Israeli athletes, killing two in the Olympic Village in the initial assault on the athletes' rooms. The incident culminated when German policewho were neither trained nor equipped for counter-terrorism operations, and had underestimated the number of terrorists involvedattempted to rescue the athletes. Police did not have a specialized tactical sniper team at that time. The army had snipers, but the German Constitution did not allow the use of German Armed Forces on German soil during peacetime.

The police rescue failed, and the operation led to the deaths of one policeman, five of the eight kidnappers and all nine of the remaining hostages.

History
As a consequence of the mismanagement of the Olympic tragedy, the West German government created the GSG 9 under the leadership of then Oberstleutnant Ulrich Wegener so that similar situations in the future could be responded to adequately and professionally. Many German politicians opposed its formation, fearing GSG 9 would rekindle memories of the Nazi Party's Schutzstaffel (SS). The decision was taken to form the unit from police forces, as opposed to the military  similar to equivalent forces in other countries, on the ground that German federal law expressly forbids the use of the military forces against the civilian population. Composing the special force from police personnel would avoid that.

The unit was officially established on 26 September 1972 as a part of Germany's federal police agency, the Bundesgrenzschutz (BGS; Federal Border Guard Service, renamed Bundespolizei or Federal Police in 2005). The then-BGS did have something of a paramilitary nature, used military ranks (until 1976), had combatant status (until 1994), and could (at least theoretically) draw conscripts (until the present).

Many other countries have various anti-terrorist units based on GSG-9.

Name change
After renaming the Bundesgrenzschutz to Bundespolizei in 2005, the abbreviation "GSG 9" was kept because of the fame of the unit even though Border Protection Units became obsolete. The official way to refer to the unit is GSG9 der Bundespolizei (abbreviated GSG9 BPOL or GSG9).

Operations
GSG 9 is deployed in cases of hostage-taking, kidnapping, terrorism, extortion and high-risk arrests e.g. in the area of serious and organised crime. An increasing number of arrests by the GSG 9 are conducted in the area of cybercrime which often requires quick arrests in order to preserve evidence. The number of deployments in cases of threats to the public safety has also increased.
The unit is very active in developing and testing methods and tactics for these missions.

In contrast to the Special Deployment Commandos of the states which are trained and equipped for similar missions, GSG 9 can only conduct operations in a state's jurisdiction with the state's consent. 
Operations on a federal level outside the Federal Republic of Germany require the foreign nation's consent, i.e. in a rescue operation of German citizens in a foreign country. Despite the unit's paramilitary nature, GSG 9 officers are strictly limited to policing operations and can't engage in military conflict since GSG 9 officers are non-combatants under international law.

Until 2009 GSG 9 regularly deployed in foreign countries as a part of a security detail to German embassies in hazardous regions. Due to the workload of these deployments, the PSA BPOL was created.

From 1972 to 2003, GSG 9 reportedly completed over 1,500 missions, discharging their weapons on only five occasions. At the SWAT World Challenge in 2005, GSG 9 won eight out of eight events, beating 17 other teams. GSG 9 defended its championship the following year, and placed fifth in 2007.

Assistance and training of other units
Following the successful rescue operation of Lufthansa Flight 181, GSG 9 received numerous requests from different nations for training their respective special operations units. For instance GSG 9 was consulted among other units in the creation of the US Army's Delta Force.

Germany offered to render assistance to India in the wake of the November 2008 Mumbai attacks. GSG 9 helped train and upgrade the National Security Guards, the primary Indian counter-terrorism unit. Further help was provided to the Mumbai Police so that they could raise a police tactical unit.

The suspected involvement of retired GSG 9 operators in training Libyan security forces in 2008 led to harsh criticism in German media coverage. The assistance in training Belarusian security forces from 2008 to 2011 by GSG9 has also been heavily criticized.

In 2015, GSG9 commenced training the specialised BFE+ operators of the Arrest units of the German Federal Police.

Missions

Its first mission, "Operation Feuerzauber" (Operation Fire Spell), immediately established the GSG 9's reputation as an elite unit. It was carried out in 1977 when Palestinian terrorists hijacked the Landshut, a Lufthansa plane on the way from Palma de Mallorca to Frankfurt, demanding that imprisoned members of the German Red Army Faction terrorist group be freed in exchange for the passengers and crew who would be held as hostages. The aircraft was then flown to several destinations throughout the Middle East.  During this time, the Lufthansa captain Jürgen Schumann was murdered by the leader of the hijackers in Aden.

However, West German Chancellor Helmut Schmidt negotiated an agreement with Somali President Siad Barre who allowed the West German a tactical unit of the GSG 9 to take over control of the crisis and the storm the plane; with this, special envoy Hans-Jürgen Wischnewski and police commander Ulrich Wegener traveled to Mogadishu with a team of 30 GSG 9 commandos.

Following a four-day odyssey, the hijackers directed the Boeing 737 to Mogadishu, Somalia, where they waited for the arrival of the Red Army Faction members after the German government had (falsely) signalled they would be released. In the night between October 17 and October 18, Somali ranger units created a distraction, while members of the GSG 9 stormed the plane.

The operation lasted seven minutes and was successful with all of the hostages rescued. Three hijackers died, the fourth was seriously injured. Only one GSG 9 member and one flight attendant were injured. The international counter-terrorism community applauded the GSG 9 for the excellent and professional handling of the situation, as assaults on planes are considered to be one of the most difficult operations that a hostage rescue force is likely to attempt. To support the GSG 9 action, two accompanying British SAS advisers provided some newly developed flash bang grenades, but ultimately the flash bangs were never used due to the fire risk inside the aircraft cabin.

Publicly known missions
October 17–18, 1977: Lufthansa Flight 181 was hijacked by four Palestinian terrorists demanding the release of Red Army Faction (RAF) members. GSG 9 officers stormed the aircraft on the ground in Mogadishu, Somalia, and freed all 86 hostages, killing three terrorists and capturing the remaining one.
1982: Arrest of RAF terrorists Brigitte Mohnhaupt and Adelheid Schulz.
 June 27, 1993: Arrest of RAF terrorists Birgit Hogefeld and Wolfgang Grams in Bad Kleinen. The theory that Wolfgang Grams was executed in revenge for the death of GSG 9 operative Michael Newrzella during the mission (Grams had shot and killed Newrzella when Newrzella tried to tackle him) was discredited by the official investigation which found that Grams committed suicide.
1993: Ending of the hijacking of a KLM flight from Tunis to Amsterdam, redirected to Düsseldorf, without firing a single shot.
1994: Ended a hostage situation in the Kassel Penitentiary.
1994: Involved in the search for the kidnappers Albert and Polak.
1998: Arrest of a man trying to extort money from the German railway company Deutsche Bahn.
1999: Arrest of Metin Kaplan in Cologne.
1999: Arrest of two suspected members of the Rote Zellen (Red Cells) in Berlin.
1999: Involved in ending the hostage situation in the central bank in Aachen.
2000: Advised the Philippines in relation to a hostage situation.
2001: Arrested two spies in Heidelberg.
2001: Assisted in the liberation of four German tourists in Egypt.
2002: Arrested a number of terrorists related to the September 11, 2001 attacks.
2003: Protection of the four members of the German Technisches Hilfswerk (THW – the civil protection organization of Germany) in Baghdad, Iraq. The THW's mission was to repair the water distribution network.
2004: GSG 9 is responsible for protecting German embassy property and personnel, including the embassy in Baghdad, Iraq. On April 7, 2004, two members were attacked and killed near Fallujah while in a convoy travelling from Amman, Jordan to Baghdad. The men, aged 25 and 38, were travelling in a car at the rear of the convoy, and therefore received most of the enemy fire after passing the ambush. The men were shot after their armoured Mitsubishi Pajero/Shogun was hit and stopped by RPGs. In a later statement, the attackers apologized for mistaking the German convoy for an American convoy. One of the bodies is still missing.
2007: Three suspected terrorists were seized on Tuesday, 4 September 2007 for planning huge bomb attacks on targets in Germany. The bombs they were planning to make would have had more explosive power than those used in the Madrid and London terror attacks. They wanted to build a bomb in southern Germany capable of killing as many as possible. Fritz Gelowicz, 29, Adem Yilmaz, 29 and Daniel Schneider, 22, were charged with membership in a terrorist organization, making preparations for a crime involving explosives and, in Schneider's case, attempted murder.
2009: The GSG 9 were on the verge of boarding a German freighter, the MV Hansa Stavanger, which had been hijacked by Somali pirates. The case of the Hansa Stavanger, at this time off the Somali coast seemed sufficiently symbolic to justify another potentially successful rescue operation, though on a much larger scale. More than 200 GSG 9, equipped with helicopters, speedboats and advanced weapons, had been secretly brought, via Kenya, to a location  from the German freighter. The United States Navy helicopter carrier  was lent to the Germans to act as their flagship, and a screen of German Navy warships flanked the Boxer. The ships had been patrolling near the Hansa Stavanger for days, waiting at a distance to evade detection on the pirates' radar screens. But the operation was called off before the rescue effort could begin. US National Security Advisor James L. Jones had called the Chancellery to cancel the operation. The US government, worried that the operation could turn into a suicide mission, was sending the USS Boxer back to the Kenyan port of Mombasa, where the German forces were to disembark. Officials at the German Federal Police headquarters in Potsdam, outside Berlin, concerned about the potential for a bloodbath, had also spoken out against the operation.
2012: GSG 9 was involved in a raid on the Hanover Hells Angels chapter leader 's house, as part of a crackdown on the group. During the raid, they knocked down the wooden gate and rappelled from a helicopter onto his residence. They are also reported to have shot a dog on the premises belonging to Hanebuth.
2016: GSG 9 was deployed to assist with the 2016 Munich shooting.
2021: GSG 9 was participating in the search for Jürgen Conings, Belgium.
2022: GSG 9 units were involved in raids to arrest members of the Reichsbürger movement suspected of plotting to overthrow the German government.
Note: The majority of this unit's missions are confidential and public information is not available. Since its inception, GSG 9 has participated in over 1,500 missions, yet reportedly fired shots only on five occasions (official count, prior to the 2003 Iraq War). These occasions were Mogadishu in 1977, Bad Kleinen in 1993, Aachen in 1999 and two more missions where firearms were used to shoot dogs of the persons being arrested.

Organization
The unit forms part of the German Bundespolizei (Federal Police, formerly Bundesgrenzschutz), and thus has normal police powers, including, for example, the power of arrest. The Federal Police of Germany (and thus the GSG 9) is under the control of the Federal Ministry of the Interior. The Bundespolizei also provides aerial transportation for the GSG 9.

On August 1, 2017, GSG 9 was transferred to the Federal Police Directorate 11 which was established as a supreme command for all special operations units of the German Federal Police.

Personnel and stations
After undergoing a process of reorganizing, the GSG 9's operational section is divided into four sub-groups called Einsatzeinheiten. All groups are capable to conducting regular operations which may involve cases of hostage taking, defusing bombs, kidnapping, terrorism or extortion. The group may also be used to secure locations, neutralize targets, sniping, and tracking fugitives.

Three of the four units are further specialized in the following fields:

 1st Operational Unit Sniping.
 2nd Operational Unit Diving and maritime operations, for example, the hijacking of ships or oil platforms.
 3rd Operational Unit Airborne operations, including parachuting and helicopter landings.
 4th Operational Unit A Berlin-based unit tasked mainly with police operations in Berlin with an emphasis on urban combat in order to respond to attacks such as the November 2015 Paris attacks. In 2017, the GSG9 announced that a CT unit will be specialized in handling CBRN situations. In 2018, it was announced that more staff were being recruited to better handle CT situations in the city.

The operational units are supported by various support units which include:

 OEM "Operative Einsatz Medizin"   The "Operative Einsatz Medizin" is a group of specialized combat Medics who deploy to the field for rescue and care for operators, hostages or civilians. A comparable German unit exists only in the German Air Force, Kampfretter. The motto of the OEM is: "Servare Vitas". OEM also has combat doctors who can make for ex. surgeries in the field.
Central services
 This service group maintains the GSG 9 armoury and is involved in testing, repairing and purchasing weapons, ammunition, and explosives.
 Documentation unit This unit handles communications, including the testing, repairing and purchasing of communications and surveillance equipment.
 Operations staff Handles the administration of GSG 9.
 Technical unit This unit supports other units in gaining entry to target areas and is responsible for the procurement, testing and issuance of non-weapon equipment. The members of the technical unit are also explosive ordnance disposal experts and they are cross-trained in direct action operations. They are trained in the rendering safe and disposal of improvised explosive devices
 Training unit This unit trains existing members, selects recruits, and trains new members.

The GSG 9 is based in Sankt Augustin-Hangelar near Bonn. Since 2018, a second station was established for one of the four GSG9 operational units in Berlin in order to reduce response times for missions in or near Berlin.

Commanders
The respective commanders of the GSG9 are the only members appearing publicly with their identity. All commanders have previously served as active operators.

 1972–1980 Ulrich Wegener
 1980–1982 Klaus Blätte
 1982–1991 Uwe Dee
 1991–1997 Jürgen Bischoff
 1997–2005 Friedrich Eichele
 2005–2014 Olaf Lindner
 since 2014 Jérôme Fuchs

Recruitment and training
Members of the Bundespolizei and other German police services below the age of 34 with at least two years of service can apply for the selection process of the GSG 9.

Selection
Candidates for the GSG 9 undergo five days of assessment in order to be accepted into the training cycle. The tests include medical examinations, psychological assessments, marksmanship training with pistol and submachine gun, oral interviews and a physical test which includes:

 Cooper test
 100 metres sprint
 Standing long jump
 A minimum of ten pull-ups
 Bench press: Minimum of ten repetitions of 75% of the candidate's body weight
 Obstacle course
 Agility test
 Resistance test against vertigo

Approximately 10-15% of all candidates pass the selection phase and are accepted in to the basic training section.

Basic training and specialisation
The subsequent 4.5-month training period includes the basic and specialized training.
During the basic training section candidates undergo vigorous training which prepares them for their tasks as operators in the GSG9. The training includes marksmanship training, tactical courses, close quarter combat, land navigation, climbing, rappelling and medical training. The basic training concludes with the final week of rigorous testing where candidates are forced to demonstrate their skills under enormous stress.

Upon successful completion of the basic training, candidates undergo various training sections for their respective specialisation. These may include parachuting, maritime operations, advanced marksmanship, advanced medical skills or EOD techniques.

Successful completion of all training cycles allows GSG9 operators to wear the GSG9 badge on their uniforms and given the title police officer for special purposes in accordance with their rank.

Further training often involves co-operation with other allied counter-terrorism units like Israel's Yamam, Australia’s Specialist Response Group, France’s Groupe d'intervention de la Gendarmerie nationale (GIGN) or (National Gendarmerie Intervention Group) and the Federal Bureau of Investigation’s Hostage Rescue Team from the United States.

Associations
 GSG9 is a member of the ATLAS Network.
 In 1975, Bischofsgrün, Bavaria, assumed a sponsorship of the GSG 9.
 Since 1983, the GSG 9 hosts the Combat Team Conference (CTC) on a four-year basis. The CTC is a competition of international special forces units.
 The GSG-9-Kameradschaft e. V.  is an association of former GSG 9 operators.
 Along with the Federal Criminal Police Office GSG 9 is part of the expert group EG GE (Expert group for kidnappings and  hostage recovery in foreign countries)

Annual Warrior Competition
GSG 9 won the 2012 Annual Warrior Competition defeating the defending 2011 champion EKO Cobra.

See also
 Zentrale Unterstützungsgruppe Zoll –  Special Support Team for Customs
 Diensteinheit IX –  East Germany's equivalent unit
 GIGN - French equivalent
 EKO Cobra - Austrian Equivalent 
 GEO - Spanish equivalent
 Public Security Section 9 – fictional Japanese variant inspired/based on GSG9

References

External links

 Official GSG 9 page of the German Federal Police
 Site of the GSG 9 companionship

1972 establishments in Germany
GSG 9